Detective Pikachu may refer to:

 Detective Pikachu (video game), a video game for the Nintendo 3DS
 Detective Pikachu (film), a 2019 fantasy film directed by Rob Letterman